Man Department is a department of Tonkpi Region in Montagnes District, Ivory Coast. In 2021, its population was 461,135 and its seat is the settlement of Man. The sub-prefectures of the department are Bogouiné, Fagnampleu, Gbangbégouiné-Yati, Logoualé, Man, Podiagouiné, Sandougou-Soba, Sangouiné, Yapleu, Zagoué, and Ziogouiné.

History

Man Department was created in 1969 as one of the 24 new departments that were created to take the place of the six departments that were being abolished. It was created from territory that was formerly part of Ouest Department. Using current boundaries as a reference, from 1969 to 1988 the department occupied the following territory: all of Guémon Region, with the exception of Duékoué Department; plus the present-day Man Department.

In 1988, Man Department was split to create Bangolo Department. In 1997, regions were introduced as new first-level subdivisions of Ivory Coast; as a result, all departments were converted into second-level subdivisions. Man Department was included as part of Dix-Huit Montagnes Region.

Man Department was split again in 2005 in order to create Kouibly Department.

In 2011, districts were introduced as new first-level subdivisions of Ivory Coast. At the same time, regions were reorganised and became second-level subdivisions and all departments were converted into third-level subdivisions. At this time, Man Department became part of Tonkpi Region in Montagnes District.

Notes

Departments of Tonkpi
1969 establishments in Ivory Coast
States and territories established in 1969